Bhimbor Deori (16 May 1903 – 30 November 1947) was an Indian freedom fighter and a lawyer from the state of Assam.

Deori was one of the main architects of the “Khasi Darbar Hall Resolutions” created on 21–23 March 1945.  In these resolutions, indigenous leaders of different ethnic identities resolved to restore their independent homelands against what they termed Indian occupation.
His father's name is Godaram Deori and his mother's name is Bajoti Deori

Deori helped found the General Secretary of Assam Backward Plains Tribal League in 1933. He stated that the government was not justified in stopping the remission of land revenue. He worked to ensure that indigenous Assamese people be allotted land . While criticizing improper mass literacy campaigns during the Assam Legislative Council budget session on 9 to 13 March 1943. With his team effort Assam province was included in Republic of India. By refusing British viceroy's plan to include in to the Pakistan.

References 

1903 births
1947 deaths